Veerabhadran is a 1979 Indian Malayalam film, directed by N. Sankaran Nair and produced by L. N. Potti. The film stars Sukumari, Hari, Ambika and Lalu Alex in the lead roles. The film has musical score by G. Devarajan.

Cast
Sukumari 
Hari 
Ambika 
Lalu Alex 
Nellikode Bhaskaran 
Rama

Soundtrack
The music was composed by G. Devarajan and the lyrics were written by L. N. Potti.

References

External links
 

1979 films
1970s Malayalam-language films
Films directed by N. Sankaran Nair